Larry Ziegler (born August 12, 1939) is an American professional golfer who has played on the PGA Tour and the Champions Tour.

Ziegler was born in St. Louis and grew up in Creve Coeur, Missouri. He was one of 14 children; he had seven brothers and six sisters. He began as a caddie and worked his way up to head club pro. He turned pro in 1959.

Ziegler had more than 40 top-10 finishes in PGA Tour events during his career including three wins. He had three top-10 finishes in major championships; his best was T3 at The Masters in 1976.

After reaching the age of 50 in August 1989, Ziegler joined the Senior PGA Tour, where he has recorded over 20 top-10 finishes including two wins. Ziegler's two Senior PGA Tour wins were six years apart - a record for the Tour. His second victory, at the 1998 Saint Luke's Classic, occurred when Ziegler's caddie was Baseball Hall of Fame member George Brett.

Ziegler once was on the board of directors for the St. Louis Blues hockey team.

Professional wins (7)

PGA Tour wins (3)

PGA Tour playoff record (1–1)

Other wins (2)
1974 Hassan II Golf Trophy
1980 Friendship Cup (Costa Rica)

Senior PGA Tour wins (2)

Results in major championships

Note: Ziegler never played in The Open Championship.

CUT = missed the half-way cut
"T" indicates a tie for a place

Summary

Most consecutive cuts made – 4 (1974 Masters – 1975 Masters)
Longest streak of top-10s – 1 (three times)

References

External links

American male golfers
PGA Tour golfers
PGA Tour Champions golfers
Golfers from St. Louis
Golfers from Orlando, Florida
1939 births
Living people